Philydor is a genus of foliage-gleaners, birds in the ovenbird family Furnariidae. It contains the following species:

 Rufous-rumped foliage-gleaner, Philydor erythrocercum (formerly erythrocercus)
 Cinnamon-rumped foliage-gleaner, Philydor pyrrhodes
 Slaty-winged foliage-gleaner, Philydor fuscipenne (formerly fuscipennis)
 Black-capped foliage-gleaner, Philydor atricapillus
 Alagoas foliage-gleaner, Philydor novaesi

References

 
Bird genera
Taxonomy articles created by Polbot